McLaughlin Peak is a peak standing  east-southeast of Mount Aaron in the northern part of the Latady Mountains, in Palmer Land, Antarctica. It was mapped by the United States Geological Survey from surveys and U.S. Navy air photos, 1961–67, and was named by the Advisory Committee on Antarctic Names for Robert H. McLaughlin, U.S. Navy, an engineman with the South Pole Station winter party in 1964.

References

Mountains of Palmer Land